Brian Keith Jones (born January 22, 1968 in Iowa) is an American sports radio and television host and former American football linebacker. Jones played one year of college football at UCLA and then transferred to University of Texas at Austin (Texas); Jones was drafted in the eighth round of the 1991 NFL Draft by the Los Angeles Raiders. Jones played NFL professional football for 6 seasons.

Early life and college career
Born in Iowa City, Iowa, Brian Jones grew up in Lubbock, Texas and graduated from Dunbar High School of Lubbock in 1986. Recruited by several colleges, Jones first attended the University of California, Los Angeles (UCLA) and played on the UCLA Bruins football team for Terry Donahue before transferring to the University of Texas at Austin in 1988. He then played the 1989 and 1990 seasons for the Texas Longhorns football team. As a senior in Texas's 1990 Southwest Conference (SWC) title run, Jones was an All-SWC selection.

Professional football playing career
After a trade from the Raiders, Brian Jones spent the 1991 NFL season playing linebacker with the Indianapolis Colts. Jones then spent the 1992 season with the Miami Dolphins and the 1994 season with the Los Angeles Raiders.  He signed with the New Orleans Saints in 1995, for which he would spend the next four seasons. In addition, Jones also played for the Scottish Claymores NFL Europe football team in 1995. Jones did not see any significant playing time after the 1996 season. Jones sat out the 1997 season because of injuries and played only in one NFL game in 1998 before being cut. In 1999, Jones filed a workers' compensation claim over his 1997 injury, but the Saints and Louisiana Workers' Compensation Corporation filed a Peremptory Exception of Prescription that was upheld by the Louisiana Circuit Courts of Appeal in 2001.

Media career
After retiring from pro football, Jones moved to Los Angeles, California, to try to start an acting career. After a few years, Jones returned to the University of Texas at Austin in spring 2000 to finish his corporate communications degree. He also hosted a weekday afternoon talk show on sports radio station KVET (AM) "1300 the Zone". Jones finished his degree by spring 2002, and became the first person in his family to graduate from college. He later moved on to working in sports television as a sideline audio tech, and later a sports reporter for University of Texas football games and a sports reporter for Fox Sports Southwest. In 2013, Jones joined CBS Sports Radio as co-host of the afternoon drive time program MoJo on CBS with the long time broadcaster Chris Moore. In February 2015 CBS Sports moved Brian to the early morning show, with sportscaster Greg Gianotti, co-hosting "Gio and Jones in the Morning" .  In March 2013 Jones was added by CBS Sports to be an analyst on College Football Today, the pre-game show for the SEC on CBS. Jones is a college football analyst with Adam Zucker of the CBS weekly Saturday morning college football program, with his former UCLA teammate UCLA football Coach Rick Neuheisel In 2017, Jones and co-host Gwen Lawrence launched the Better Man show and BetterManShow.com , a nationally syndicated lifestyle TV program for men. The Better Man show is currently syndicated to more than 73 million homes.

In October, 2020 the internet sportsbook BetUS announced NFL Hall of Famer Warren Sapp and Brian Jones as the hosts of the weekly podcast "BetUS Unfiltered". Sapp and Jones have interviewed celebrities such as Derrick Johnson, Adam Schefter, Ray Lewis, Kevin Carter, Rick Neuheisel, and Jen Welter on the podcast.

References

External links
NFL.com profile
MoJo show site
Better Man site

1968 births
Living people
American football linebackers
Indianapolis Colts players
New Orleans Saints players
Sportspeople from Iowa City, Iowa
Sportspeople from Lubbock, Texas
Players of American football from Iowa
Players of American football from Texas
Scottish Claymores players
Texas Longhorns football players
UCLA Bruins football players